Ron Ormond (born Vittorio Di Naro, August 29, 1910 – May 11, 1981) was an American author, showman, screenwriter, film producer, and film director of Western, musical, and exploitation films.  Following his survival of a 1968 plane crash, Ormond began making Christian films.

Early life
Ron Ormond was born Vittorio Di Naro, anglicised to Vic Narro. He took his surname from his friend, magician and hypnotist Ormond McGill. Ormond married the vaudeville singer and dancer June Carr (1912–2006) six weeks after he met her during a run of 1935 stage performances at the Capitol Theater in Portland, Ore. Calling himself "Rahn Ormond," Ormond performed magic and acted as the show's master of ceremonies. They remained married until his death.  They became partners in film production and had two sons. The first son, Victor, died of pneumonia, and their second son, Tim, acted in several of their films. June Ormond's father actor, former nightclub owner and burlesque comic Cliff Taylor, also appeared in many of the Ormond's films.

Career
Ormond's first film was as an uncredited technical director for the Monogram Pictures feature The Shanghai Cobra (1945). Ormond formed Western Adventure Productions, Inc. in 1948 and formed a partnership with Lash LaRue, writing and producing and eventually directing his films.  Western Adventure Productions ceased operating in 1951 after completing eight films, but four more films were made into 1952 using large amounts of footage from the previous films with various names credited for the screenplays such as Ormond's young son Tim and associate producer Ira Webb.

Ormond's first credit was 1948's Dead Man's Gold. Ormond made his directing debut in King of the Bullwhip with La Rue in 1950. Ormond also wrote a series of Westerns starring former Hopalong Cassidy sidekicks James Ellison and Russell Hayden. Western Adventure acquired reissue rights to a number of Hal Roach's Laurel and Hardy comedies, and distributed them along with its own productions.

Ormond prospered when former exhibitor Robert L. Lippert released several of his productions to theaters. These economically made features were generally musical comedies, often in revue format, featuring vaudeville, nightclub, and minstrel acts. Titles like Square Dance Jubilee (1949), Hollywood Varieties (1950), and Varieties on Parade (1951), were welcomed by theater owners, especially in rural areas and smaller towns. 

As the economics of producing B picture Westerns changed in the era of television, Ormond formed a company called Howco from the initials of Ormond's collaborators, drive-in movie owners J. Francis White and Joy Houck. Howco had an ambitious beginning, producing a moderately expensive western filmed in Cinecolor with familiar Hollywood players, Outlaw Women (1952). Ormond and his partners soon targeted the teenage drive-in audience with quickie exploitation features,  such as Mesa of Lost Women, Untamed Mistress, Teenage Bride (also known as Please Don't Touch Me) and country-music movies such as 1965's 40 Acre Feud, featuring country-music stars George Jones, Bill Anderson and Skeeter Davis, and 1967's White Lightnin' Road, a racetrack melodrama starring country singer and frequent Ormond actor Earl "Snake" Richards.

During the 1950s Ormond spent eight months with Ormond McGill in Asia writing the book Religious Mysteries of the Orient/Into the Strange Unknown, about psychic surgery. Other books by McGill and Ormond include The Master Method of Hypnosis, The Art of Meditation, and The Magical Pendulum of the Orient.

Later years
In the mid-'60s Ormond produced roller derby on television for Leo Seltzer, with his son Tim as one of the players in the children's version of the sport.  Tim loved it. Ron, not so much.

At the time, roller derby was big business, at least for Leo Seltzer, a San Fernando Valley businessman. Ormond managed the derby, which held weekly skate-offs at the Olympic auditorium in downtown Los Angeles. Ormond ended up leaving the Derby after telling Seltzer, "I can't work for you and still remain your friend, and I consider you a good friend."

After making more exploitation films such as The Monster and the Stripper and 1966's The Girl from Tobacco Row, Ormond began making films about Christianity in the 1970s. He had crashed his single-engine airplane into a field near Nashville in 1966 while en route to a screening of The Girl from Tobacco Row, and he seems to have emerged from the accident—he spent months recovering from serious injuries—a Christian. Made with Mississippi evangelist  Estus Pirkle,  If Footmen Tire You, What Will Horses Do?, The Burning Hell
and The Believer's Heaven address the second coming of Jesus Christ, communism and American conformism, with Pirkle's preaching the basis of the films. In 1979 he directed 39 Stripes, the tale of a former chain-gang member who converts to Christianity. He also directed 1976's The Grim Reaper, produced by June Ormond, as well as Surrender at Navajo Canyon for Pete Rice, and a travelogue for John Rice. The Second Coming was next on the agenda, but Ormond died of cancer before production.  The script was written by Tim Ormond, and produced by him and June Ormond.  The film is dedicated to the memory of Ron Ormond and John Rice.

Biographer Jimmy McDonough has been working on a Ormond family biography for years. Film director Nicolas Winding Refn is publishing the book, titled The Exotic Ones: That Fabulous Film-Making Family from Music City, U.S.A. – The Ormonds in May, 2023.

Filmography

As a director
The Second Coming (1980)
39 Stripes (1979)
The Believer's Heaven (1977)
The Burning Hell (1974)
If Footmen Tire You, What Will Horses Do? (1971)
The Girl from Tobacco Row (1966)
Frontier Woman	(1956)
Untamed Mistress (1956)
Mesa of Lost Women (1953)
Outlaw Women (1952)
The Black Lash (1952)
The Frontier Phantom (1952)
Varieties on Parade (1951)
The Thundering Trail (1951)
Kentucky Jubilee (1951)
Yes Sir, Mr. Bones (1951)
The Vanishing Outpost (1951)
King of the Bullwhip (1951)

References

External links
Ron Ormond at GCDB
Ron Ormond at IMDB
Ron Ormond at Turner Classic Movies

1910 births
1981 deaths
20th-century American businesspeople
American film directors
American film producers
Survivors of aviation accidents or incidents